Givens Hill, also known by locals as Patterberry Hill, is an unincorporated community in Houston County, Texas.

Unincorporated communities in Houston County, Texas
Unincorporated communities in Texas